Minderoo Foundation's Walk Free initiative is an independent, privately funded international human rights organisation based in Perth, Western Australia. Walk Free works towards ending modern slavery in all its forms by taking a multifaceted and global approach.

Sustainable Development Goal (SDG) 8.7 seeks to end modern slavery by mobilising the international community. Walk Free’s approach to achieving SDG 8.7 involves building a robust knowledge base to inform action and driving legislative change in key countries in partnership with faiths, businesses, academics, NGOs, and governments around the world. Through these partnerships, direct implementation, and grassroots community engagement Walk Free believes modern slavery can be eradicated.

The initiative was founded by Andrew Forrest, Nicola Forrest and Grace Forrest in 2010. Walk Free are best known for their publication of the Global Slavery Index, now in its fourth edition.

In 2013, Walk Free became a co-founder of the Freedom Fund, an anti-slavery non-profit organisation. The Freedom Fund works to tackle the many forms of modern slavery in regions where it is most highly concentrated.

Global estimates of modern slavery
In 2017, the inaugural Global Estimates of Modern Slavery were produced by the International Labour Organization and Walk Free in partnership with the International Organization for Migration. The analysis drew on data from nationally representative surveys implemented through the Gallup World Poll including a module on modern slavery in 48 countries, and data from the Global Slavery Index Vulnerability Model.

Acknowledged data gaps in earlier editions of the Global Slavery Index, including lack of data on forced sexual exploitation and children in modern slavery, were addressed by adopting a combined methodological approach when developing the Global Estimates of Modern Slavery. This involved drawing on three sources of data:

 The existing Global Slavery Index survey program was expanded to include 54 surveys covering 48 countries. More than 71,000 people have been interviewed and the countries surveyed represent over half of the world’s population. It is the most extensive survey program on modern slavery ever undertaken and forms the central component of the Global Estimates of Modern Slavery.
 Administrative data from the International Organization for Migration’s databases of assisted victims of trafficking, and
 Data derived from validated secondary sources and a systematic review of comments from the International Labour Organization supervisory bodies regarding ILO Conventions on forced labour.

Global Slavery Index

The Global Slavery Index presents a ranking of 167 countries based on the percentage of the population estimated to be in modern slavery.

In 2013, Walk Free released the first edition of the Global Slavery Index. Later editions were released in 2014, 2016 and 2018. The 2018 Global Slavery Index Vulnerability Model provides a risk score for 167 countries while the Government Response Index provides an assessment on 181 governments.

The index provides rankings across three dimensions:
 Size of the problem: What is the estimated prevalence of modern slavery country by country in terms of percentage of population and absolute figures
 Government response: How are governments tackling modern slavery
 Vulnerability: What factors explain or predict the prevalence of modern slavery

The methodology of early editions of the Global Slavery Index has been criticized by researchers Andrew Guth, Robyn Anderson, Kasey Kinnard, and Hang Tran. According to their analysis of the 2014 edition, the Index's methods had significant and critical weaknesses which raised questions about its replicability and validity.

The Walk Free Foundation has stated that it "welcomes constructive criticism", and subsequent editions of the Global Slavery Index, published in 2016 and 2018, have undergone significant changes to the methodology to determine prevalence estimates.

Resources
As well as the Global Slavery Index and the Global Estimates of Modern Slavery, Walk Free have produced a number of other reports. Recent releases include  
 Measurement Action Freedom: An independent assessment of government progress towards achieving UN Sustainable Development Goal 8.7
 Bitter Sweets: Prevalence of forced labour & child labour in the cocoa sectors of Côte d'Ivoire & Ghana
 Pervasive, Punitive and Predetermined: Understanding Modern Slavery in North Korea
 Beyond Compliance: The Modern Slavery Act Research Project
 The G20 Obligation: Achieving Sustainable, Fair, and Inclusive Global Supply Chains
 The Faith Community’s Role in Ending Modern Slavery
 Towards a Common Future: Achieving SDG 8.7 in the Commonwealth

See also
Slavery
Contemporary slavery

References

External links
Home page

Contemporary slavery
Organizations that combat human trafficking